Super Street Fighter II Turbo  is a fighting game released for the arcades by Capcom in Japan on February 23, 1994, in North America on February 23 and March 26, 1994 (beta) and in Europe in March 1994 (beta). It is the fifth installment in the Street Fighter II sub-series of Street Fighter games, following Super Street Fighter II: The New Challengers. Like its predecessor, it ran on the CP System II hardware.

Super Turbo introduced several new gameplay mechanics not present in previous versions of Street Fighter II, including the addition of combination moves called super combos and air combos. It also introduced the secret character Akuma, who would go on to become a recurring character in later Street Fighter installments and other Capcom fighting games.

Super Turbo was originally ported to the 3DO Interactive Multiplayer, followed by the PlayStation and Sega Saturn (under the title of Super Street Fighter II Turbo: The Ultimate Championship) as part of the Street Fighter Collection, and for the Dreamcast in Japan under the title of Super Street Fighter II X for Matching Service. A remake of the game was released for the PlayStation 3 and Xbox 360 titled Super Street Fighter II Turbo HD Remix.

While not as much of a commercial success as previous iterations of the game, the game was well received by critics and had a huge impact on the competitive fighting game "e-sport" circuit. Super Street Fighter II Turbo is still played competitively almost 30 years after its original release, and is the oldest fighting game that still has an active competitive tournament scene throughout the world.

Characters

Super Street Fighter II Turbo allows players to play as versions of characters from the original Super Street Fighter II in addition to their regular counterparts in the game by inputting a code for each character. The character would play as they would in Super Street Fighter II, with subtle differences. For example, the alternate version of Sagat in Super Turbo can now cancel his light kick into any special move, whereas in Super Street Fighter II he couldn't.

Super Street Fighter II Turbo also saw the introduction of the series' first secret character, Akuma (Gouki in Japan). Akuma is playable only as a secret character.  He can be used by inputting a code at the player select screen. Even in this weakened form, he is the most powerful character in the game, and has historically been banned in all competitive tournaments of the game, including updated versions of Super Turbo.

Gameplay

Super Street Fighter II Turbo featured several changes and additions to the play mechanics inherited from Super Street Fighter II. The HUD featured new graphics. The original opening sequence and unused sequence, which had featured two generic characters fighting in front of a crowd, was replaced by a new opening featuring lead character Ryu launching a Hadouken projectile towards the screen, now intertwined with images of Chun-Li and Cammy, as well as brief flashes of the image of new hidden character Akuma. New animation frames were drawn for all the victory poses and the basic and special moves of the characters. For example, Chun-Li received a new animation for her Kikōken (fireball) projectile.
A large criticism of Super Street Fighter II was the slower game speed in comparison to the previous release, Street Fighter II: Hyper Fighting.  Super Turbo was the first Street Fighter game released in arcades to feature an adjustable speed setting. The game speed can be adjusted through the system configuration by the games operator or (if the speed setting is set to "Free Select") can be chosen by the player at the start of the game. The player has a choice between four speed settings.

Super Street Fighter II Turbo introduced "Super Combos". After building up the "Super" meter, players can execute a multi-hit automatic combo which deals a large amount of damage.

Home versions

Direct Ports

3DO Interactive Multiplayer

The 3DO port was released on November 13, 1994 in Japan, with subsequent releases in North America and Europe during the same year. While the graphics are more accurately reproduced compared to the previous console ports for 16-bit platforms, the game doesn't support parallax scrolling and is missing animations on characters. Also, the Super versions of characters are not present.

The reports of juddery ingame action from CD is false and has never been reported since decades.  The CD does not impact gameplay.

The soundtrack features the same remixed music from the FM Towns version of Super Street Fighter II (with a few additional remixes specific to Super Turbo). This port also features "CPS1 Chains", a feature that only existed in the arcade versions up until Hyper Fighting.

MS-DOS and Amiga
The MS-DOS version, developed by Eurocom and published by GameTek, was released in May 1995 in North America and Europe.  There are secret commands to use each character's original color scheme or attacks that were removed from the 3DO version due to memory constraints. The option menus have custom settings (such as enabling and disabling parallax scrolling) that allows the game to be played with low hardware specifications. The biggest change is the game's resolution; the game is played with a resolution of 320×200 on AT/PC-compatible machines and, since the graphic data is ported straight from the arcade version, all of the characters appear large due to the narrow screen size. Because of this, the distance between both fighters at the beginning of a match is slightly narrower than in the arcade version. There were many glitches in the initial shipments of the DOS port, such as characters landing and recovering normally after being knocked out with a basic attack in mid-air. A patch file was distributed that corrected these glitches, which were later fixed in version 1.5 of the retail release. A patch file for version 1.6 was released as well. The music was remixed, although the arrangements are different from the ones used in the 3DO soundtrack.

The Amiga port was also released by Gametek (and ported by Human Soft) in 1996, which is graphically very close to the original arcade version and features a remixed soundtrack, but suffers from jerky animation and other shortcomings when played on an unexpanded machine.

PlayStation and Sega Saturn
Super Turbo is included in the Street Fighter Collection compilation for the PlayStation and Sega Saturn, which also includes Super Street Fighter II on the same disc, as well as Street Fighter Alpha 2 Gold on a second disc. There is a small delay at the beginning of every match, and there are numerous small differences from the arcade version.

Dreamcast
Capcom released Super Street Fighter II X for Matching Service for the Dreamcast in Japan exclusively as a mail-order release via the online Dreamcast Direct store (later known as Sega Direct) on December 22, 2000. The Dreamcast version features an online versus mode on Sega's "Matching Service" compatible only on analog modems. (The Matching Service closed on September 1, 2003.) The bonus mini-games from previous versions of Street Fighter II, which had been cut from the arcade, were restored in this version and can be enabled via a special options menu making it more arcade-accurate. Other secret options are available as well. The Dreamcast version is considerably more accurate than the PlayStation and Sega Saturn versions, as almost nothing was changed aside from the score display. It features additional speed settings including faster speeds (speeds 4–6) and a very slow speed (speed 0) that doesn't remove any frames.

PlayStation 2 and Xbox
Super Turbo is included in Capcom Classics Collection Vol. 2 for the PlayStation 2 and Xbox. Although the first compilation included the first three Street Fighter II games, the second volume skipped the original Super Street Fighter II and only included Super Turbo. This version has many glitches.

PlayStation 4, Xbox One, Switch & Steam
Super Street Fighter II Turbo is included in Street Fighter 30th Anniversary Collection. The existing updates of this title are not included in the collection as Hyper Street Fighter II is exclusive to arcade, PlayStation 2 and Xbox, while Ultra Street Fighter II is exclusive to Switch. In this release, save states are featured in the source code, while other features can be toggled on and off. Regarding online functionality, this title (along with Street Fighter II: Hyper Fighting, Street Fighter Alpha 3 and Street Fighter III: 3rd Strike) has availability for multiplayer matches.

Rearranged Versions

Super Street Fighter II Turbo Revival
Released on June 13, 2001 in Japan, with subsequent releases in North America and Europe by Capcom, Super Street Fighter II Turbo Revival is a port of Super Turbo for the Game Boy Advance (GBA) with new character illustrations and title screen. It was re-released as a Virtual Console game for the Wii U in 2015. The GBA only has four buttons used for attacks, though the four action buttons can be easily customized. Although most of the basic character sprites and animations were transferred from the SNES version of the original Super Street Fighter II, the new techniques that were added from Super Turbo used the same sprites and animations as the arcade version. This results in a few characters suddenly growing in size for a moment when performing certain moves, such as Guile's standing heavy kick, since the arcade version used bigger sprites than the SNES version. Likewise, the animation frames when a character advances towards an opponent are the same when he or she retreats. Only Akuma uses character sprites exclusively from the arcade version and his advancing and retreating animations are different as a result.

Several stages have been changed: Ken's, Guile's and M. Bison's stages are completely new, Zangief's and Balrog's have been heavily modified, Ryu's is taken from Street Fighter III: 3rd Strike and Chun-Li's from Street Fighter Alpha 2. Akuma now has his own stage, which is an altered version of Ryu's. All the voice clips of the characters are taken from the arcade version with the exception of Ryu's, which is based on the original Street Fighter II, while Akuma's voice clips are from the Street Fighter Alpha series. While the music quality is not of the same rate as the arcade version, the danger versions of the stage themes are included just like the arcade version's and there are exclusive remixes as well.

Akuma can use the Shun Goku Satsu as a Super Combo, unlike in the arcade version (where he had none). The player can also unlock Shin Akuma, a variation of Akuma who boasts even greater fighting skills, in addition to the regular version. He can also use the Shun Goku Satsu Super Combo.

Turbo Revival was a runner-up for GameSpots annual "Best Fighting Game" award among console games, losing to Garou: Mark of the Wolves.

Hyper Street Fighter II: The Anniversary Edition
In 2003, Capcom released this version of the game that allowed you to select every previous iteration of the main cast over the course of the 5 different main SF2 titles (World Warrior, Champion Edition, Hyper Fighting, Super, Super Turbo), provided that character was selectable in that game. This version was released on CPS-2 arcade, PlayStation 2 and Xbox.

Super Street Fighter II Turbo HD Remix

In 2008, Capcom published Super Street Fighter II Turbo HD Remix, an HD port of the game for the PlayStation 3 and Xbox 360 available as a downloadable title. It was developed by Backbone Entertainment. It features a 1080p resolution with graphics by artists from Udon (authors of the Street Fighter comic book series), an arranged soundtrack provided by Overclocked Remix, and adjustments to the game's balance by David Sirlin with input from the competitive community. This version was based on the source code from Super Street Fighter II X for Matching Service for Dreamcast. The game allows you to select between normal and "classic" mode, which uses classic sprites and doesn't use the balance changes. It was played at EVO Championship Series in 2009 and 2010.

Ultra Street Fighter II: The Final Challengers
In 2017, Capcom announced they would be making Ultra Street Fighter II: The Final Challengers for the Nintendo Switch. This version adds Evil Ryu (previously introduced in the Alpha series) and Violent Ken (introduced in SNK vs. Capcom: SVC Chaos), and allows players to select Akuma on the character select screen. Also, Shin Akuma is now a playable character; he can be selected by performing a series of specific button inputs on the character select screen, and is only usable offline.

Reception

In Japan, Game Machine listed Super Street Fighter II Turbo on their April 15, 1994 issue as being the second most-successful table arcade unit of the month, just below Virtua Fighter while outperforming titles like Art of Fighting 2 and Karnov's Revenge. It went on to become Japan's highest-grossing arcade game of 1994, and sixth highest of 1995. In the United States, Super Street Fighter II Turbo was the top-earning arcade printed circuit board (PCB) in May 1994. It was one of America's top twelve best-selling arcade video games of 1994.

In the January 30, 1995 issue of Japanese magazine Gamest, Super Street Fighter II X (known as Super Turbo internationally) placed fourth place in the award for Best Game of 1994 and Best Fighting Game. Upon release on home consoles, Famicom Tsūshin scored the 3DO version of the game a 29 out of 40.

The four reviewers of Electronic Gaming Monthly gave the 3DO version a unanimous score of 8/10, commenting that the graphics and content accurately recreate the arcade version, and that the control is "near perfect" even when using the standard 3DO pad. In contrast, GamePro stated that the control is imperfect even with Panasonic's six-button controller, and is terrible with the standard pad due to the "mushy" D-pad. They also criticized the absence of the older versions of the fighters and concluded that the port, though "a reasonably close translation of the coin-op", falls second to the SNES version of Street Fighter II: Hyper Fighting among Street Fighter II conversions. A reviewer for Next Generation concurred with GamePro that the 3DO controllers are not optimal for the game, but still held it to be "without a doubt, the best version [of Street Fighter II] to hit home systems." He described the conversion as "colorful, fast, and so impressive you hardly notice the disk access time between rounds." Arcade Sushi ranked Super Street Fighter II Turbo as the "best fighting game", adding that it "is easily the most loved, and the most played game in the franchise. If you haven't played this fighter, then you haven't played fighting games at all." Future Publishing's Ultimate Future Games gave the 3DO version a 95% score, hailing it as the "game that'll save the 3DO". They praised it as the "ultimate beat 'em up" while their only criticism was the "Slow CD access" times. In 2019, Game Informer ranked it as the 3rd best fighting game of all time.

Competitive play
Super Street Fighter II Turbo has been a staple in the competitive fighting game scene for its entire existence in one form or another. It was a featured game at the Evolution Championship Series (EVO) from 2002 to 2008. Its remixed version,  Super Street Fighter II Turbo: HD Remix, was played in 2009 and 2010. It has returned to EVO as a featured side event as the invite/qualifier limited "Tournament of Legends" in 2012 and 2014 and the "ST Games" in 2013. The game is also a staple at the Japanese X-MANIA series of tournaments and has featured in the Tougeki Super Battle Opera series of tournaments multiple times.

Notes

References

Further reading

External links
 Official website for the GBA version 
 
 Super  Street Fighter II Turbo at Eurocom

1994 video games
3DO Interactive Multiplayer games
Amiga games
Amiga 1200 games
Arcade video games
Bruceploitation
Amiga CD32 games
CP System II games
DOS games
Fighting games
2D fighting games
Fighting games used at the Evolution Championship Series tournament
Fighting games used at the Super Battle Opera tournament
Game Boy Advance games
GameTek games
PlayStation 2 games
Street Fighter games
Video games developed in Japan
Virtual Console games
Virtual Console games for Wii U
Video games set in Brazil
Video games set in China
Video games set in England
Video games set in Hong Kong
Video games set in India
Video games set in Jamaica
Video games set in Japan
Video games set in Mexico
Video games set in Myanmar
Video games set in the Soviet Union
Video games set in Spain
Video games set in Thailand
Video games set in the United States
Eurocom games
Multiplayer and single-player video games